Netherlands competed at the 1992 Summer Paralympics in Barcelona, Spain. The team included 99 athletes, 72 men and 27 women. Competitors from Netherlands won 39 medals, including 14 gold, 14 silver and 11 bronze to finish 9th in the medal table.

See also
Netherlands at the Paralympics
Netherlands at the 1992 Summer Olympics

References 

Nations at the 1992 Summer Paralympics
1992
Summer Paralympics